James or Jim Elam may refer to:

 James M. Elam (1796–1856), American soldier and politician
 James Essex Elam (1829–1873), American politician, mayor of Baton Rouge
 James Elam (American football), American football coach
 James Elam (physician) (1918–1995), American physician
 Jim Elam (1920–1961), American baseball player